Virgilio Ferrari (9 March 1888 – 12 June 1975) was an Italian Democratic Socialist Party politician. He was mayor of Milan. He was appointed Knight Grand Cross of the Order of Merit of the Italian Republic.

References

20th-century Italian politicians
Knights Grand Cross of the Order of Merit of the Italian Republic
Italian Democratic Socialist Party politicians
Mayors of Milan
Knights Commander of the Order of Merit of the Federal Republic of Germany
1888 births
1975 deaths